George Washington Vanderbilt III (September 23, 1914 – June 24, 1961) was an American yachtsman and scientific explorer who was a member of the prominent Vanderbilt family.

Early life
Born in Newport, Rhode Island, he was the younger son of Alfred Gwynne Vanderbilt and Margaret Emerson. He was the brother of Alfred Gwynne Vanderbilt Jr. and a half-brother to William Henry Vanderbilt III from his father's first marriage to Ellen "Elsie" French. In 1915, when George was less than a year old, his father perished in the sinking of the RMS Lusitania. He received the first quarter of his inheritance at 21, then 25, 30, and the last at 35. His mother, Margaret, remarried two more times, first to Raymond T. Baker, with whom she had a daughter, Gloria Baker (1920–1975), and second, to Charles Minot Amory.

He was a grandson of Cornelius Vanderbilt II and Alice Claypoole Gwynne and was named in honor of his great-great-uncle George Washington Vanderbilt and his great-uncle George Washington Vanderbilt II. Vanderbilt's maternal grandfather, Isaac Edward Emerson, was a very wealthy businessman who made a fortune in a variety of business ventures including patent medicines, the most notable of which was Bromo-Seltzer. A sailing enthusiast, Emerson instilled a love for the sport in young George from an early age and as an adult, he used his sailing skills and wealth for scientific research.

He attended the St. Paul's School in Concord, New Hampshire and the Adirondack-Florida School studying at the Saranac branch in New York as well as in Miami.

Career
In 1936 and 1937, George Vanderbilt sponsored a renewal of auto races for the Vanderbilt Cup, founded by his uncle, William Kissam Vanderbilt II, in 1904.

During World War II, he served in the U.S. Navy like his two brothers. He was promoted to lieutenant on May 1, 1943, and received the Legion of Merit award.

Scientific research
Vanderbilt did not attend college, but by the time he turned 21, he had already led two expeditions to Panama and Africa, with some lasting up to 10 months, bringing back various snakes, fish, insects and birds. In 1937, he went on a six month with the Philadelphia Academy of Natural Sciences to the South Seas, bringing back 20,000 species of birds, fish and reptiles. He owned several yachts and used them to conduct scientific expeditions all over the globe. His voyages conducted important research in expeditions to Africa in 1934 and aboard the schooner Cressida, he made an ocean journey in 1937 to the South Pacific (visiting many islands with a wide geographic range) that carried out a systematic study of more than 10,000 fish specimens (434 species in 210 genera).

His fifth major expedition was on the schooner Pioneer in 1941 to the Bahamas, Caribbean Sea, Panama, Galapagos Archipelago and Mexican Pacific Islands.

He established the George Vanderbilt Foundation, of which he was president, for scientific research around marine biology.  However, outside of academic circles, his important work has mostly been overshadowed by the lavish lifestyles and the Vanderbilt mansions of some of the other members of the Vanderbilt family.

Personal life

George Vanderbilt was married four times throughout his life. His first marriage was in 1935, when he married Lucille "Lulu" Miriam Parsons (1912–2013). Lulu was born in Montclair, New Jersey and her father, J. Lester Parsons, founded the international re-insurance firm of Crum & Forster in 1896.  Together, George and Lulu had:
Lucille Margaret Vanderbilt (1938 - 2018), who was married to Philip Brady, Jr from 1958 until their divorce 1962. Later in 1962, she married Robert Mathews Balding, divorcing in 1970. Her third and final marriage was to Wallace Fennel Pate (1933-1993).

In 1950, the Vanderbilts divorced, and Lulu married Ronald Bush Balcom (d. 1994), a champion skier who had previous attained celebrity when he became the third husband of Standard Oil heiress Millicent Rogers. Also in 1950, George Vanderbilt married Anita C. Zabala Howard at his home in South Carolina. She was a descendant of one of California's first Spanish families and the former wife of California sportsman Lindsay C. Howard. They divorced in 1958 after nearly 8 years of marriage.

In 1958, he married for the third time to Joyce "Josh" Branning, (1926–2016) daughter of Enid and Ralph Branning. They later divorced and, in 1963, she married Edward L. Doheny III (d. 1999), grandson of Edward L. Doheny.

On March 23, 1961, he married Louise Mitchell Paine in Scottsdale, Arizona. She was a member of the Board of Directors of the Children’s Cancer Fund of America and was the daughter of Harold E. Mitchell and had previously been married to Edward Bragg Paine (d. 1951). Edward's widow later married Lord Malcolm Douglas-Hamilton. They were only married for three months as Vanderbilt died in June 1961.

Residences
In 1935, he purchased the  Charles W. Sloane estate on Middle Neck Road in Sands Point on the Long Island Sound, shortly after his first marriage. In 1937, he had commissioned a home by society architects Treanor & Fatio on the property.  He sold the home to Henry Lustig, founder of the Longchamps chain of restaurants, in 1945.

In 1946, he purchased  in Siskiyou County near Lake Shastina and the Shasta–Trinity National Forest in northern California.  In 1949, he built a large ranch house known as "Shadow Valley Ranch", along with a guest cottage, carriage house, tennis court, riding trails, waterfalls and several barns. The home was host to many important people of the times, including overnight guests Harry Truman, John Wayne, Audrey Hepburn, Spencer Tracy, Clark Gable, Alan Ladd and Ginger Rogers. The house was sold by his widow in 1990 and burned down in 2012.

He also lived in Honolulu, Hawaii for 25 years and owned the Arcadia Plantation in Georgetown, South Carolina, which had been purchased by his grandfather, Dr. Emerson, in 1906.

His former yacht, the Pioneer, is now the Yankee Clipper, which sails with passengers in the Caribbean for Windjammer Barefoot Cruises.

Death
On June 24, 1961, George Washington Vanderbilt apparently committed suicide by leaping from his 10th floor suite at the Mark Hopkins Hotel in San Francisco, California. His wife said he was despondent over unspecified business setbacks. Investigators found large amounts of alcohol in his blood stream.

References

Notes

Sources
 Curiosity served: Biltmore opens servants' quarters, Tim Whitmire, Associated Press via The San Diego Union-Tribune, December 25, 2005.
 Antiques of the Biltmore Estate at go-star.com

1914 births
1961 suicides
Alcohol-related deaths in California
American people of Dutch descent
Suicides by jumping in California
St. Paul's School (New Hampshire) alumni
George Washington III